Dong'e County falls under the jurisdiction of Liaocheng Prefecture-level city, in the Shandong Province of China.

The county is regionally and nationally renowned for the production of Ejiao, a donkey-hide gelatine used in traditional Chinese medicine. 
According to a ca. 1723 account by the French Jesuits Dominique Parrenin, there was a well in this county which was normally kept closed and sealed, and which was only opened when water was taken to be used in preparation of Ejiao for the emperor's court.

Administrative divisions
As 2012, this County is divided to 2 subdistricts, 7 towns and 2 townships.
Subdistricts
Tongcheng Subdistrict
Xincheng Subdistrict

Towns

Townships
Yushan Township
Chenji Township

Climate

See also
Cheng Yu
Ejiao

Famous people
Su Shulin, Governor of Fujian

Notes

 
Counties of Shandong
Liaocheng